Mayom may refer to:
 Mayom, South Sudan, a town in Unity State, South Sudan
 Mayom County, an administrative region in Unity State, South Sudan 
 Máyom, the Thai language name for Phyllanthus acidus